This is a list of football (soccer) clubs in Ukraine.
Below is a list of football clubs in Ukraine.

The list contains all clubs:
Ukraininan competitions (since 1992)
 Ukrainian Championship participants in the Premier League, First, Second and former Third league;
 Ukrainian Cup participants;
 Ukrainian Amateur Championships medalists;
 Ukrainian Amateur Cup finalists;
Soviet competitions (before 1992)
 USSR Championship participants in the Top, First, and former Group D;
 USSR Cup participants.
 Football Championship of the Ukrainian SSR participants in the Soviet Second league and Soviet Second lower league;
 Football Cup of the Ukrainian SSR finalists;
 Ukrainian Amateur Championships (Soviet period) medalists;
 Ukrainian Amateur Cup (Soviet period) finalists;

It also contains the best clubs that participated in the Championship of Poland, Czechoslovakia, Hungary, Romania, the Russian Empire and the Soviet Union championship cities in the years 1918-1935, which are now cities on the territory of Ukraine.

The second and third club team was not added to the list.

By league
Ukrainian period
Premier Liha (Level 1)
First Liha (Level 2)
Druha Liha (Level 3)

Soviet period
Vysshaya Liga (Level 1, all-Union)
Pervaya Liga (Level 2, all-Union)
Vtoraya Liga (Level 3, republican)

Alphabetically

Notes: Status
 P - professional club
 A - amateur club
 D - defunct club

List of Ukrainian football clubs admitted to All-Union competitions
 1936 (sp): Dynamo Kyiv, Dynamo Dnipropetrovsk, Dynamo Kharkiv, Dynamo Odesa, Spartak Kharkiv, Ugolschiki Stalino, Lokomotyv Kyiv, Traktornyi Zavod Kharkiv, Stal Dnipropetrovsk
 1936 (fl): Serp i Molot Kharkiv
 1937: Zavod im. Frunze Kostiantynivka
 1939: Sudnobudivnyk Mykolaiv, Dzerzhynets Voroshylovhrad
 1940: Kharchovyk Odesa
 1946: Spartak Uzhhorod, DO Kiev, Bilshovyk Zaporizhia
 1947: Lokomotyv Kharkiv, Spartak Lviv, Spartak Kherson, Dzerzhynets Kharkiv, Dynamo Voroshylovhrad
 1948: Lokomotyv Zaporizhia, Avanhard Kramatorsk, Shakhtar Kadiivka, Bilshovyk Mukachevo
 1949: Spartak Kyiv, Dynamo Chernivtsi, Trudovi Rezervy Voroshylovhrad
 1953: Metalurh Odesa, Metalurh Zaporizhia
 1954: ODO Lvov, DOF Sevastopol
 1955: DOF Odesa
 1956: Spartak Ivano-Frankivsk
 1957: Kolhospnyk Poltava, Khimik Dniprodzerzhynsk
 1958: Zirka Kirovohrad, Kolhospnyk Cherkasy, Avanhard Simferopol, Lokomotyv Vinnytsia, Kolhospnyk Rivne, Lokomotyv Donetsk, SKVO Odesa
 1959: Arsenal Kyiv, Avanhard Zhytomyr, Kryvyi Rih, Avanhard Ternopil, Shakhtar Horlivka
 1960: Avanhard Zhovti Vody, Avanhard Chernivtsi, Volyn Lutsk, Naftovyk Drohobych, Desna Chernihiv, Dynamo Khmelnytskyi, Azovstal Zhdanov, Khimik Severodonetsk, Avanhard Sumy
 1962: Trubnyk Nikopol, Shakhtar Oleksandria
 1963: Karpaty Lviv, Dnipro Kremenchuk, Burevisnyk Melitopol, Metalurh Komunarsk, Metalurh Yenakieve, Metalurh Kerch
 1964: Temp Kyiv, Chaika Balaklava, Dunayets Izmail
 1965: Dynamo-2 Kyiv, Avtomobilist Odesa, Shakhtar Torez, Shakhtar Krasnyi Luch
 1966: Avanhard Makiivka, Start Dzerzhynsk, Torpedo Berdiansk
 1967: Enerhia Nova Kakhovka, Stal Dnipropetrovsk, Sitall Kostiantynivka
 1968: Shakhtar Chervonohrad, Kolos Yakymivka, Prohres Berdychiv, Podillia Kamianets-Podilskyi, Shakhtar Novovolynsk, Ugolyok Krasnoarmiisk, Avanhard Rovenky, Shakhtar Sverdlovsk, Lokomotyv Dnipropetrovsk
 1969: Budivelnyk Pervomaisk, Avanhard Antratsyt
 1970: Shakhtar Kirovsk
 1972: Mayak Kharkiv, Shakhtar Makiivka
 1976: Kolos Nikopol
 1979: Metalurh Dniprodzerzhynsk
 1981: Kolos Mezhyrich
 1983: Nyva Berezhany
 1984: Dynamo Irpin
 1985: Torpedo Zaporizhia
 1986: Naftovyk Okhtyrka
 1991: Avtomobilist Sumy, Mayak Ochakiv, Temp Shepetivka, Karpaty Kamianka-Buzka

List of football clubs admitted to professional by skipping the league's tier
This list includes association football clubs that were admitted to professional competitions without playing at the Ukrainian national amateur level (formerly KFK competitions). The list includes clubs that were admitted to professional tiers under any circumstances other than following the league's pyramid structure. Almost every year there was at least one club that was promoted without playing at the national amateur competitions with various types of excuses.
1992 season
 second teams: FC Dynamo-2 Kyiv, FC Shakhtar-2 Donetsk, FC Chornomorets-2 Odesa
1992–93 season
 FC Avanhard Zhydachiv (dissolved in 1996)
 FC Dynamo Luhansk (merged with FC Metalurh Mariupol in 1995)
1993–94 season
 FC Medyk Morshyn (relegated in 1994)
 FC Viktor Zaporizhzhia (dissolved in 2000)
 FC Lviv (1992) (merged with FC Karpaty Lviv in 2001)
 FC Boryspil (dissolved in 2014)
1994–95 season
 none (but with the ongoing season FC Slavutych while playing at amateurs replaced professional FC Transimpeks Vyshneve)
1995–96 season
 FC Ratusha Kamianets-Podilskyi (random team to finish the season for FC Temp Shepetivka)
 FC Metalurh Donetsk (merged with FC Stal Kamianske in 2015, due to the Russian aggression against Ukraine)
1996–97 season
 FC Petrivtsi (dissolved in 2000)
 FC Nyva Bershad
1997–98 season
 FC Berkut Bedevlya (dissolved in 1998)
 FC Fortuna Sharhorod (dissolved in 1999)
 FC SKA-Lotto Odesa (dissolved in 1998)
 FC Hirnyk Pavlohrad (dissolved in 1998)
 FC Borysfen Boryspil (dissolved in 2007)
 second teams: FC Karpaty-2 (later FC Karpaty-3 Lviv), FC Dnipro-2 Dnipropetrovsk, FC Zirka-2 Kirovohrad, FC Vorskla-2 Poltava, FC Metalurh-2 Donetsk, FC Metalist-2 Kharkiv (by replacing FC Avanhard Merefa)
1998–99 season
 FC VPS Kramatorsk (dissolved in 1999)
 second teams: FC Kryvbas-2 Kryvyi Rih, FC Metalurh-2 Zaporizhzhia

Note: after this season amateur competitions were transitioned back to the Soviet competition calendar spring–fall
1999–00 season
 FC ADOMS Kremenchuk (dissolved in 2001)
 FC Mashynobudivnyk Druzhkivka (dissolved in 2002)
 second teams: FC Prykarpattia-2 Ivano-Frankivsk, FC Nyva Vinnytsia (second team of FC Vinnytsia), FC Chornomorets-2 Odesa (in place of SC Odesa)
2000–01 season
 FC Krasyliv (dissolved in 2007)
 FC Sokil Zolochiv (dissolved in 2003)
 second teams: Ternopil-Nyva-2, FC Dnipro-3 Dnipropetrovsk, FC Cherkasy-2, FC Metalurh-2 Mariupol, FC Stal-2 Alchevsk, FC Shakhtar-3 Donetsk, SSSOR-Metalurh Zaporizhzhia
2001–02 season
 FC Chornohora Ivano-Frankivsk (dissolved in 2006)
 FC Chaika Sevastopol (dissolved in 2002)
 FC Dynamo Simferopol (dissolved in 2009)
 FC Torpedo Zaporizhzhia (relegated in 2003)
 second teams: FC Zakarpattia-2 Uzhhorod, FC Borysfen-2 Boryspil, FC Obolon-2 Kyiv, FC Metalurh-2 Donetsk, FC Karpaty-2 Lviv replaced FC Lviv (1992) and at the same time FC Karpaty-3 Lviv replaced FC Karpaty-2 Lviv (also there was admitted FC Kovel-Volyn-2 in place of FC Kovel) 
2002–03 season
 PFC Sevastopol (dissolved in 2014, due to the Russian aggression against Ukraine)
 second teams: none (introduction of the Ukrainian junior competitions among professional teams)
2003–04 season
 FC Palmira Odesa (dissolved in 2005)
 second teams: FC Kryvbas-2 Kryvyi Rih, FC Arsenal-2 Kyiv (FC Spartak-2 Kalush replaced promotable FC LUKOR Kalush to avoid relegation of FC Spartak Ivano-Frankivsk)
2004–05 season
 FC Fakel Ivano-Frankivsk (dissolved in 2012)
 PFC Oleksandriya
 MFC Oleksandriya
 second teams: none (introduction of Ukrainian junior competitions among top league teams)
2005–06 season
 FC Kharkiv (promoted to the top league instead of FC Arsenal Kharkiv)
 FC Knyazha Shchaslyve
 MFC Zhytomyr (FC Polissya Zhytomyr withdrew and its place were created MFC Zhytomyr and OFC Zhytychi Zhytomyr)
 FC Yalos Yalta
 second teams: FC Kryvbas-2 Kryvyi Rih, FC Nyva-2 Vinnytsia, FC Kharkiv-2
2006–07 season
Second League reduced to two groups
 none
2007–08 season
 FC Korosten
 FC Komunalnyk Luhansk
 FC Poltava
 FC Titan Donetsk
 FC Olimpik Kirovohrad
 second teams: none
2008–09 season
 second teams: FC Desna-2 Chernihiv, FC Knyazha-2 Shchaslyve, PFC Sevastopol-2
2009–10 season
 FC Morshyn (later changed to FC Skala Stryi (2004))
 second teams: FC Lviv-2
2010–11 season
 second teams: FC Chornomorets-2 Odesa, FC Dnipro-2 Dnipropetrovsk
2011–12 season
 second teams: FC Sevastopol-2
2012–13 season
 second teams: FC Poltava-2-Karlivka (later FC Karlivka), FC Obolon-2 Kyiv
2013–14 season
Second League reduced to a single group
 none
2014–15 season
 none (no promotions whatsoever)
2015–16 season
 FC Veres Rivne
 FC Arsenal-Kyiv
 FC Barsa Sumy
 second teams: none
2016–17 season
 second teams: FC Illichivets-2 Mariupol
2017–18 season
Second League returned to two groups
 SC Dnipro-1
 second teams: MFC Mykolaiv-2
2018–19 season
 none, the newly promoted FC Lviv has swapped places with the Premier League club FC Veres Rivne

List of clubs that were merged (split)
 FC Arsenal Kyiv (originally as FC Boryspil)
 FC Nyva Myronivka (1993–94)
 FC CSKA Kyiv (1995–2001)
 FC Mariupol
 FC Dynamo Luhansk
 FC Spartak Ivano-Frankivsk
 FC Kalush
 FC Karpaty Lviv
 FC Lviv (1992)
 FC Temp Shepetivka
 FC Advis Khmelnytskyi
 FC Poltava
 FC Karlivka
 FC Ros Bila Tserkva
 FC Transimpeks Vyshneve
 FC Enerhiya Yuzhnoukrainsk
 FC Artania Ochakiv
 FC Krasyliv
 FC Obolon Kyiv
 FC Podillya Khmelnytskyi
 FC Metalist Kharkiv
 FC Avanhard Merefa
 FC Stal Kamianske
 FC Metalurh Donetsk
 FC Volyn Lutsk
 FC Kovel
 FC Chornomorets Odesa
 SC Odesa
 FC Borysfen Boryspil
 FC Systema-Boreks Borodyanka
 FC Oleksandriya
 FC UkrAhroKom Holovkivka
 FC Slavutych Cherkasy
 FC Zorya Biloziria

List of clubs successors after relocation
 FC Boryspil → FC CSKA-Borysfen Kyiv (eventually FC Arsenal Kyiv)
 FC Systema-Boreks Borodyanka → FC Inter Boyarka
 FC Transimpeks Vyshneve → FC Slavutych
 FC Makiyivvuhillya Makiivka → FC Nikopol
 FC Temp Shepetivka → FC Ratusha Kamianets-Podilskyi
 FC Stal Kamianske → FC Feniks Bucha
 FC Hazovyk Komarno → FC Hazovyk-Skala Stryi → FC Lviv
 FC Karpaty Kamianka-Buzka → FC Skala Stryi
 FC Morshyn → FC Skala Stryi (2004)
 FC Karpaty Kamianka-Buzka → FC Halychyna Lviv
 FC Yavir Krasnopillia → FC Spartak Sumy
 FC Yavir Krasnopillia → PFC Sumy
 SKA Lviv → FC Halychyna Drohobych
 FC Dnister Ovidiopol → FC Odesa
 FC Avanhard Zhovti Vody → FC Sirius Kryvyi Rih
 FC Petrivtsi → FC Myrhorod

List of clubs that were split (revival of original club)
 FC CSKA-Borysfen Kyiv → FC CSKA Kyiv → FC Arsenal Kyiv
 FC Borysfen Boryspil (revival of original)
 FC Zorya Luhansk
 FC Komunalnyk Luhansk
 FC Nyva Ternopil
 FC Ternopil
 FC Arsenal Kharkiv
 FC Kharkiv
 FC Spartak Sumy
 FC Yavir Krasnopillia (revival of original) → PFC Sumy
 FC Skala Stryi
 FC Karpaty Kamianka-Buzka (revival of original) → FC Halychyna Lviv
 FC Shakhtar Shakhtarsk
 FC Metalurh Donetsk
 FC Polissya Zhytomyr
 MFC Zhytomyr
 OFC Zhytychi Zhytomyr
 FC Oleksandriya
 FC UkrAhroKom Holovkivka (revival of original)

List of clubs that were "swapped"
 FC Zirka Kirovohrad ←→ FC Olimpik Kirovohrad
 FC Spartak Ivano-Frankivsk ←→ FC Kalush (concealed by merger)
 FC Veres Rivne ←→ FC Lviv

References
 Ukraine - List of Foundation Dates
 Ukraine 1992 and subsequent years
 Football Federation of Ukraine Official website 
 Professional Football League of Ukraine Official website 
 AAFU Official website 
 UkrSoccerHistory 
 Fanat.com.ua 
 UA-футбол 

 
Ukraine
clubs
Football clubs